Battle of Cedar Creek was a battle fought in Virginia in 1864 during the American Civil War. 

Battle of Cedar Creek may also refer to:

 Battle of Cedar Creek (Jacksonville), a battle fought in Florida in 1864 during the American Civil War
 Battle of Cedar Creek (1876), a battle fought in the Montana Territory during the Great Sioux War of 1876